Steve Warr (born January 5, 1951) is a Canadian former professional ice hockey defenceman.  He was drafted by the Buffalo Sabres of the National Hockey League in the fifth round, 61st overall, of the 1971 NHL Entry Draft; however, he never played in that league. He played 72 regular-season games and two playoff games in the World Hockey Association with the Ottawa Nationals in the 1972–73 season and two more playoff games with the Toronto Toros in the 1973–74 season.

Awards and honors

References

External links

1951 births
Buffalo Sabres draft picks
Canadian ice hockey defencemen
Clarkson Golden Knights men's ice hockey players
Sportspeople from Peterborough, Ontario
Jacksonville Barons players
Living people
Ottawa Nationals players
Syracuse Eagles players
Toronto Toros players
Ice hockey people from Ontario
AHCA Division I men's ice hockey All-Americans